Paul Cressall (2 May 1893 – 8 April 1943) was an English cricketer. He played in four first-class matches for British Guiana from 1911 to 1923. He died in the Stanley Internment Camp during World War II.

See also
 List of Guyanese representative cricketers

References

External links
 

1893 births
1943 deaths
English cricketers
Guyana cricketers
People from Bromley
British people who died in Japanese internment camps
Internees at Stanley Internment Camp